Upper Cross Street (Chinese: 克罗士街上段) is a street located in Chinatown within the Outram Planning Area in Singapore. The street starts after Cross Street at the junction of Cross Street and South Bridge Road, with the street ending at the junction of Chin Swee Road, Havelock Road and Clemenceau Avenue. The street then continues on to Havelock Road. There are a number of shophouses on the street, housing restaurants and shops, with a Spring Court restaurant along the street. The Housing and Development Board development, Hong Lim Complex is also located on this street. Other landmarks include Yue Hwa Building (the former Great Southern Hotel), OG People's Park, Hotel 81 Chinatown, Chinatown Point and the Subordinate Courts. The entrance to the Central Expressway towards the north.

Landmarks
These are the prominent landmarks along Upper Cross Street (from east to west).
Hong Lim Complex
Beary Best! Hostel
Chinatown MRT station
Chinatown Point
Spring Court restaurant
Hotel 81 Chinatown
Yue Hwa Building (Former Great Southern Hotel)
OG People's Park
People's Park Centre
Subordinate Courts
People's Park Food Centre and HDB estate

References
Victor R Savage, Brenda S A Yeoh (2004), Toponymics - A Study of Singapore Street Names, Eastern University Press, 

Roads in Singapore
Outram, Singapore
Chinatown, Singapore